The South Africa women's national football team has represented South Africa at the FIFA Women's World Cup on one occasion, in 2019.

FIFA Women's World Cup record

Record by opponent

2019 FIFA Women's World Cup

Group B

2023 FIFA Women's World Cup

Group G

Goalscorers

References

 
Countries at the FIFA Women's World Cup